The 1936 Quebec general election was held on August 17, 1936, to elect members of the Legislative Assembly of the Province of Quebec, Canada. The Union Nationale, led by Maurice Duplessis, defeated the incumbent Quebec Liberal Party, led by Adélard Godbout.

This marked the end of slightly more than 39 consecutive years in power for the Liberals, who had governed Quebec since the 1897 election.

This 1936 election had been called less than one year after the 1935 election after Liberal premier Louis-Alexandre Taschereau resigned because of a scandal. He was replaced by Godbout as Liberal leader and premier.

This was Duplessis's first term in office. After losing the subsequent 1939 election, he later won four more general elections in a row, and became the dominant politician of his time. It was also the Union Nationales first election, having been formed from a merger between the Action libérale nationale and the Quebec Conservative Party.

Results

|-
! colspan=2 rowspan=2 | Political party
! rowspan=2 | Party leader
! colspan=4 | MPPs
! colspan=4 | Votes
|-
! Candidates
!1935
!1936
!±
!#
! ±
!%
! ± (pp)
|-
||  
|style="text-align:left;" |Union Nationale
|style="text-align:left;"|Maurice Duplessis
|90
|42
|76
|34
|323,812
|61,138
|56.88
|8.47
|-
|rowspan="3" |  
|style="text-align:left;" colspan="10"|Liberals and allies|-
|style="text-align:left;" |
|style="text-align:left;"|Adélard Godbout
|88
|47
|14
|33
|224,374
|25,212
|39.41
|7.12
|-
|style="text-align:left;" |
|style="text-align:left;"|–
|2
|–
|–
|–
|3,765
|3,150
|0.66
|0.55
|-
|rowspan="9" |  
|style="text-align:left;" colspan="10"|Other candidates'
|-
|style="text-align:left;" |
|style="text-align:left;"|–
|11
|1
|–
|1
|9,746
|11,841
|1.71
|2.31
|-
|style="text-align:left;" |
|style="text-align:left;"|–
|3
|–
|–
|–
|1,928
|
|0.34
|
|-
|style="text-align:left;" |
|style="text-align:left;"|–
|3
|–
|–
|–
|1,870
|1,833
|0.33
|0..33
|-
|style="text-align:left;" |
|style="text-align:left;"|–
|1
|–
|–
|–
|1,469
|
|0.26
|
|-
|style="text-align:left;" |
|style="text-align:left;"|–
|3
|–
|–
|–
|1,045
|
|0.18
|
|-
|style="text-align:left;" |
|style="text-align:left;"|–
|2
|–
|–
|–
|767
|
|0.13
|
|-
|style="text-align:left;" |
|style="text-align:left;"|–
|1
|–
|–
|–
|470
|
|0.08
|
|-
|style="text-align:left;" |
|style="text-align:left;"|–
|1
|–
|–
|–
|79
|2,159
|0.01
|0.41
|-
! colspan="3" style="text-align:left;" | Total
| 205
! " colspan="3"| 90
! " colspan="2"| 569,325
! " colspan="2"| 100%
|-
| colspan="7" style="text-align:left;" | Rejected ballots
| 4,930
| 10,302
| colspan="2"|
|-
| colspan="7" style="text-align:left;" | Voter turnout
| 574,255
| 22,662
| 76.94
| 0.78
|-
| colspan="7" style="text-align:left;" | Registered electors (contested ridings only)
| 746,414
| 22,154
| colspan="2"|
|-
| colspan="5" style="text-align:left;" | Candidates returned by acclamation
| –
| 3
| colspan="4"|
|}

See also
 List of Quebec premiers
 Politics of Quebec
 Timeline of Quebec history
 List of Quebec political parties
 20th Legislative Assembly of Quebec

Further reading

References

Quebec general election
Elections in Quebec
General election
Quebec general election